Eungbongsan is a mountain in Hongcheon county, Gangwon-do, in South Korea.

See also
 List of mountains in Korea

Notes

References
 

Mountains of Gangwon Province, South Korea
Hongcheon County
Mountains of South Korea
One-thousanders of South Korea